Martín Carrera is a station on the Mexico City Metro. It is located at the borders of the Colonia Martín Carrera, Colonia 15 de Agosto, and Colonia Díaz Mirón districts in the Gustavo A. Madero borough, in the north of Mexico City. The station logo depicts bust of General Martín Carrera, a national hero who fought in the Mexican–American War of 1846–48.

General information
Martín Carrera is both a terminal station and a transfer station, linking Lines 4 and 6, both of which terminate here. Like other terminal stations on the network, this one is multimodal: it connects with suburban bus lines that serve areas including Cerro Gordo, Vía Morelos, and others across the state line of the State of Mexico. The station also connects with trolleybus line "LL", which runs between the San Felipe de Jesús neighbourhood and Metro Hidalgo. The station is near the Basílica de Guadalupe, a Roman Catholic shrine and place of pilgrimage.

The station was opened with the others along the northern portion of Line 4 on 29 August 1981. Service along Line 6 started on 8 July 1986.

Ridership

References

External links 

Mexico City Metro Line 4 stations
Railway stations opened in 1981
1981 establishments in Mexico
Railway stations opened in 1986
1986 establishments in Mexico
Mexico City Metro stations in Gustavo A. Madero, Mexico City
Mexico City Metro Line 6 stations